Cnephasia disforma is a species of moth of the family Tortricidae. It is found on Crete.

The wingspan is about 14 mm for males and 15 mm for females. The forewings are grey, strigulated with brown-grey. The hindwings are brown grey. Adults have been recorded on wing from May to June.

References

Moths described in 1983
disforma
Taxa named by Józef Razowski